Nefyodov is a Russian surname. It may refer to:

 Filipp Nefyodov (1838–1902), Russian writer, journalist, editor, ethnographer and archeologist
 Oleksandr Nefyodov (born 1966), former Ukrainian football player
 Valentin Nefyodov (born 1982), Russian football player